The lesser dwarf shrew (Suncus varilla) is a species of mammal in the family Soricidae. It is found in Botswana, Democratic Republic of the Congo, Lesotho, Malawi, Mozambique, South Africa, Tanzania, Zambia, and Zimbabwe.

References

Suncus
Taxonomy articles created by Polbot
Mammals described in 1895
Taxa named by Oldfield Thomas